Caloptilia ulmi is a moth of the family Gracillariidae. It is known from China, Japan (Honshū, Hokkaidō) and the Russian Far East.

The wingspan is 11–14 mm.

The larvae feed on Ulmus davidiana, Ulmus japonica, Ulmus laciniata and Zelkova serrata. They mine the leaves of their host plant.

References

ulmi
Moths of Asia
Moths described in 1982